WMXU (106.1 FM, "Mix 106.1") is a radio station licensed to serve the community of Starkville, Mississippi, and serving the Columbus, Mississippi area. The station airs an urban AC format.

External links

MXU
Urban adult contemporary radio stations in the United States
Cumulus Media radio stations